Dol or doljanchi is a Korean tradition that celebrates the first birthday of a baby.
This ceremony blesses the child with a prosperous future and has taken on great significance in Korea. The birthday babies wear a hanbok and a traditional hat: a jobawi or gulle for baby girls and a bokgeon or hogeon (호건) for baby boys.

History 
In the past, the death rates for children were high and many children died before their first birthday, so it was an important milestone for the baby and parents. The whole village used to celebrate a baby's first birthday, sharing food and wishing for long life and fortune for the baby. It could also define who they would be when they grow older.

Doljabi (돌잡이): fortune telling custom 

The highlight of the dol (돌) is a custom called the doljabi (돌잡이) where the child is placed in front of a table of foods and objects such as string, paint or calligraphy brushes, ink, and money. The child is then urged to pick up an object from the table. It is believed the one selected will foretell the child's future. For example, if the child picks up a paint/calligraphy brush or book, they are destined to be smart. If they pick up money, they will be wealthy; if they pick up food, they will not be hungry. If the child picks up the thread, it is believed they will live a long life. These items were used by most households in the past. 

The types of objects placed on the table for the baby to choose from have evolved over time as a reflection of society's evolving perception of successful occupations. However, there are many parents who remain more traditional in their selection of objects to place on the table. A sea of items could be used to create a modern doljabi set whereas specific items are necessary to create a traditional doljabi set. Doljabi is followed by feasting, singing, and playing with the toddler. Most often, guests will present gifts of money, clothes, or gold rings to the parents for the child at this time.

'Dol' food 

At home family members give thanks to Samshin (three gods who are believed to take care of the baby's life while growing up) by serving plain rice, seaweed soup, and rice cakes. For the party, parents prepare a special 'Dol' table, where food is stacked high to symbolize a life of prosperity for the baby. The table is set mainly with a rice cake of pretty rainbow layers, seaweed soup, and fruits. Miyeok guk (seaweed soup) is served on every birthday after the first birthday to remind people of what their mother went through to bring them into the world.

Modern Doljanchi 
The celebration is usually held in buffet restaurants or wedding halls. Parents prepare some prizes for guests and upon entering the party, everyone gets a piece of paper on which a number is written. During the party guests who correctly answer a question about the baby win a prize. The host of the party, or an entertainer, also calls out a number randomly, and the person who has that number receives a prize.

Alternatively, guests bet on which item the baby will choose at the Doljabi (fortune-telling game) to win a prize.

See also 
Korean birthday celebrations
Korean age reckoning
Armenian first birthday ritual of Agra Hadig to pick fortuitous objects
Chinese first birthday ritual of Zhuazhou to pick fortuitous objects

References

External links 

Birthday Celebrations 
10 Unique Korean Customs & Practices
Korean food Culture Series-Part 8 Rites of Passage and Ceremonial Foods 
Child's First birthday
Example of Traditional Doljabi Set vs Modern Doljabi Set

Korean cuisine
Korean culture
Rites of passage